This is a list of British television related events in 1929.

Events

Births
 17 February – Patricia Routledge, actress
 21 February – James Beck, actor (died 1973)
 24 March – Francis Essex, television producer (died 2009)
 5 April – Nigel Hawthorne, actor (died 2001)
 14 April – Gerry Anderson, puppeteer, television producer and director (died 2012)
 18 April – Peter Jeffrey, actor (died 1999)
 25 May – Arthur Montford, Scottish sports journalist (died 2014) 
 26 May – Lloyd Reckord, Jamaican-born actor (died 2015)
 9 July – Christopher Morahan, director and production executive (died 2017)
 30 August – Ian McNaught-Davis, television presenter (died 2014)
 14 September – Michael Peacock, television executive (died 2019)
 25 September – Ronnie Barker, comic actor (died 2005)
 27 November – Alan Simpson, comedy scriptwriter (died 2017)
 16 December – Nicholas Courtney, actor (Doctor Who) (died 2011)
 25 December – Stuart Hall, journalist and television presenter
 26 December – Irene Shubik, television drama producer (died 2019)
 31 December – David Nixon, magician and television personality (died 1978)

See also
 1929 in British music
 1929 in the United Kingdom
 List of British films of 1929

References